Piclozotan (SUN-N4057) is a selective 5-HT1A receptor partial agonist, which has neuroprotective effects in animal studies. It has been through early clinical trials in humans for treatment of acute stroke, but results have not yet been announced.

See also 
 Repinotan
 Robalzotan

References 

Carboxamides
Benzoxazepines
2-Pyridyl compounds
Lactams
Organochlorides
Tetrahydropyridines